Actinopus echinus is a species of mygalomorph spiders in the family Actinopodidae. It is found Brazil.

References

echinus
Spiders described in 1949